Main-Spessart is a Landkreis (district) in the northwest of Bavaria, Germany. It is located in Lower Franconia and derives its name from the river Main and the wooded hills of the Spessart.

Geography
The district is bounded by (from the north and clockwise) the districts of Bad Kissingen, Schweinfurt and Würzburg, the state of Baden-Württemberg (district of Main-Tauber), the districts of Miltenberg and Aschaffenburg, and the state of Hesse (district of Main-Kinzig).

The river Main forms a large horse-shoe bend in the district, entering in the southeast near Thüngersheim and leaving to the southwest near Hasloch. In the north it is joined by the Franconian Saale river at Gemünden. The Spessart hills cover most of the area of the district west and north of the Main. To the northeast, the district borders on the Rhön hills.

History
The district was established in 1972 by merging the former districts of Gemünden, Karlstadt, Lohr and Marktheidenfeld. Although Lohr is the largest town, the seat of the administration is located in Karlstadt.

Politics 

 Main-Spessart (electoral district)

Economy
In 2017 (latest data available) the GDP per inhabitant was €36,264. This places the district 44th out of 96 districts (rural and urban) in Bavaria (overall average: €46,698).

Coat of arms
The coat of arms displays:
 a wheel symbolising the clerical state of Mainz
 the arms of the bishopric of Würzburg
 an oak leaf representing the forests of the area
 a bunch of grapes symbolising viticulture
 a wavy line representing the river Main

Towns and municipalities

References

External links

 (German)

 
Districts of Bavaria
Spessart